Blu del Barrio (born September 15, 1997) is an American actor, best known for playing Adira Tal in Star Trek: Discovery. They are the first openly non-binary actor, playing the first non-binary role in Star Trek. Del Barrio has studied and engaged in the performing arts since childhood, graduating from the London Academy of Music and Dramatic Art (LAMDA) in 2019. They are outspoken in support of transgender visibility and inclusivity with accurate depiction in popular media.

Personal life 
Born September 15, 1997; del Barrio is a native of Southern California, growing up in Topanga. They came out as non-binary in 2019 and  uses they/them/theirs pronouns. Through their whole life, they had difficulty with their gender, realizing they might be non-binary after seeing Lachlan Watson on television. Being cast as a non-binary character in Star Trek: Discovery helped them come out publicly as non-binary. They chose the first name Blu in 2019, in honor of their favorite color from childhood.

They have referred to themself as an introverted nerd who likes being alone, loves watching movies, video games, photography and playing Dungeons & Dragons (DnD) with friends. Cast members of Star Trek: Discovery, including del Barrio and the regular Noah Averbach-Katz (the dungeon master), Anthony Rapp and Ian Alexander, and guests including Mary Wiseman, Emily Coutts and Rapp's fiancé Ken Ithiphol started playing DnD together during the filming of the fourth season of Discovery and, by request, stream their sessions as Disco Does DnD via Twitch. Upon joining the cast of Star Trek: Discovery with fellow actor Alexander, del Barrio felt a little overwhelmed, in part due to feeling impostor syndrome, believing someone with more experience should have the role, and has expressed thankfulness for Alexander's presence and support.

Del Barrio is passionate and forthright in support of visibility for trans people, telling Nick Adams, director of transgender representation at GLAAD (Gay & Lesbian Alliance Against Defamation) in 2020, that "it's not only important that we're talking about our experiences, it's necessary. People need to know who we are", and continued, saying that what they "want people to understand is that we do 'fit,' but not into the strict gender binary our society has created." They believe "non-binary people deserve to live in a world where they fit."

They are bilingual, speaking both Spanish and English to a native standard, and are a skilled paddleboarder.

Career 
Del Barrio studied ballet and theater in California before moving to the UK to study at the London Academy of Music and Dramatic Art (LAMDA), graduating in 2019. They are highly-skilled in the art of stage combat, dance and singing, having acted in theater and short films since seven years of age. They were cast in their first major role in September 2020; it was announced that they would join the cast of Star Trek: Discovery as Adira Tal for the third season. Del Barrio felt a resonance with the highly intelligent, introverted character with, what they consider to be, puppy-like emotions. They are the first out non-binary actor in Star Trek, and Adira is Star Trek'''s first non-binary character. They told Nick Adams of GLAAD in 2020:
When I got the call that I'd been cast as Adira, I hadn't yet told the majority of my friends and family that I was non-binary. I had only recently discovered the word and realized that it described how I'd felt for a long time. I knew I wanted to tell my friends and family, so when this happened, it felt like the universe saying "go ahead." So in a way, Adira's story ends up mirroring mine. Just after I told people in my life, so did Adira. Definitely not the most common coming out story, but it was scary, special, and life changing (as they usually are).
Speaking with Adam B. Vary for Variety in 2020, Discovery co-showrunners Alex Kurtzman and Michelle Paradise explained that they felt a responsibility to bring trans and non-binary character stories into the show, and that casting del Barrio in the role was an easy choice, even shaping the character of Adira to fit who they called an extraordinary person. Ian Alexander played the trill Gray Tal (although originally auditioning for the role of Adira), a species Vary described as "avatars for LGBTQ representation on Star Trek", as Adira's lover and, thanks to Nick Adams providing examples, both Alexander and del Barrio realized the potency of those episodes featuring the trill for queer representation.

They have named Lachlan Watson, Indya Moore, Bex Taylor-Klaus, Theo Germaine, Asia Kate Dillon, and Brigette Lundy-Paine as non-binary role models for their career.

Del Barrio has expressed a desire for a role in any Tim Burton film and would like to collaborate on relatively smaller budget independent films.

 Filmography 
 Stage 
 Duchess of Malfi, The Duchess –  company: LAMDA; director: Rodney Cottier
 Hippolytus, Artemis –  company: LAMDA; director: John Baxter
 Kin, Rachel –  company: LAMDA; director: Gretchen Egolf
 Natasha, Pierre & The Great Comet of 1812, Hélène Bezukhova –  company: LAMDA; director: Louise Shephard
 The Man of Mode, Mrs. Loveit –  company: LAMDA; director: Beth Vyse
 The White Devil, Vittoria –  company: LAMDA; director: Rodney Cottier
 The Winter's Tale, Paulina/Shepherd –  company: LAMDA; director: Phillip Edgerly
 Three Days in the Country, Natasha Ivanovna – company: LAMDA; director: Mary Papadima
 Three Sisters, Irina –  company: LAMDA; director: Caroline Leslie
 Otis & Eunice (2019), Duke – a retelling of Orpheus and Eurydice created by Sharon Clark, featuring actors from multiple stage schools performing simultaneously at two locations, with audiences at each being able to watch the other via video streaming; directors: Mabel Aitken, Ian Morgan and AJ Quinn

 Film 
 In the Service of the Queen (2019), Yaris – short film
 The Listener (2022) – post-production<ref>{{Cite web |url=https://deadline.com/2022/08/tiff-jason-reitman-steve-buscemi-bill-pohlad-1235098228/  |title=TIFF Industry Selects Section Includes Steve Buscemi's The Listener', Bill Pohlad's Dreamin' Wild; Jason Reitman's Live Read Returns |last=D'Alessandro |first=Anthony |date=August 23, 2022 |website=Deadline Hollywood |language=en-US |url-status=live |archive-url=https://web.archive.org/web/20220823161717/https://deadline.com/2022/08/tiff-jason-reitman-steve-buscemi-bill-pohlad-1235098228/ |archive-date=August 23, 2022 |access-date=December 29, 2022}}</ref>

Television 
 Star Trek: Discovery (2020–present), Adira Tal – recurring role (season 3); series regular (season 4)
 The Owl House (2022), Raine Whispers (teenaged) – animated series; voice actor; Disney's first non-binary character

Web 
 Dirty Laundry, Season 1, Episode 5, Who Hid $20,000 Inside a Bowflex?

References

External links 
 
 
 Disco does DnD – on Twitch

1997 births
21st-century American actors
21st-century American LGBT people
Alumni of the London Academy of Music and Dramatic Art
American non-binary actors
American people of Argentine descent
American television actors
LGBT Hispanic and Latino American people
LGBT people from California
Living people
People from Topanga, California